The 2018–19 Women's Senior T20 Challenger Trophy was the second edition of the women's T20 tournament in India, and the first time the tournament had been played since 2009–10. It was played from 14 August to 21 August 2018. The participating teams were India Blue, India Green and India Red. It was played in double round-robin format followed by a final. India Blue defeated India Red by 4 runs in the final to win their first T20 title.

Squads

Fatima Jaffer was replaced by Krutika Chaudhari due to injury.

Standings 

 The top two teams qualified for the finals. 
Last updated: 18 August 2018

Group stage

Final

Statistics

Most runs

Most wickets

References

2018–19 Indian women's cricket
2018–19
Domestic cricket competitions in 2018–19
Senior Women's T20 Challenger Trophy